An ovarian cyst is a fluid-filled sac within the ovary. Often they cause no symptoms. Occasionally they may produce bloating, lower abdominal pain, or lower back pain. The majority of cysts are harmless. If the cyst either breaks open or causes twisting of the ovary, it may cause severe pain. This may result in vomiting or feeling faint, and even cause head aches.

Most ovarian cysts are related to ovulation, being either follicular cysts or corpus luteum cysts. Other types include cysts due to endometriosis, dermoid cysts, and cystadenomas. Many small cysts occur in both ovaries in polycystic ovary syndrome (PCOS). Pelvic inflammatory disease may also result in cysts. Rarely, cysts may be a form of ovarian cancer. Diagnosis is undertaken by pelvic examination with an ultrasound or other testing used to gather further details.

Often, cysts are simply observed over time. If they cause pain, medications such as paracetamol (acetaminophen) or ibuprofen may be used. Hormonal birth control may be used to prevent further cysts in those who are frequently affected. However, evidence does not support birth control as a treatment of current cysts. If they do not go away after several months, get larger, look unusual, or cause pain, they may be removed by surgery.

Most women of reproductive age develop small cysts each month. Large cysts that cause problems occur in about 8% of women before menopause. Ovarian cysts are present in about 16% of women after menopause and if present are more likely to be cancer.

Signs and symptoms

Some or all of the following symptoms may be present, though it is possible not to experience any symptoms:
 Abdominal pain. Dull aching pain within the abdomen or pelvis, especially during intercourse.
 Uterine bleeding. Pain during or shortly after beginning or end of menstrual period; irregular periods, or abnormal uterine bleeding or spotting.
 Fullness, heaviness, pressure, swelling, or bloating in the abdomen.
 When a cyst ruptures from the ovary, there may be sudden and sharp pain in the lower abdomen on one side.
 Change in frequency or ease of urination (such as inability to fully empty the bladder), or difficulty with bowel movements due to pressure on adjacent pelvic anatomy.
 Constitutional symptoms such as fatigue, headaches.
 Nausea or vomiting
 Weight gain
Other symptoms may depend on the cause of the cysts:
 Symptoms that may occur if the cause of the cysts is polycystic ovarian syndrome (PCOS) may include increased facial hair or body hair, acne, obesity and infertility.
 If the cause is endometriosis, then periods may be heavy, and intercourse painful.

The effect of cysts not related to PCOS on fertility is unclear.

Cyst rupture 
A ruptured ovarian cyst is usually self-limiting, and only requires keeping an eye on the situation and pain medications. The main symptom is abdominal pain, which may last a few days to several weeks, but they can also be asymptomatic. Rupture of large ovarian cysts can cause bleeding inside the abdominal cavity and in some cases shock.

Ovarian torsion 
Ovarian cysts increase the risk for ovarian torsion; cysts which are larger than 4 cm are associated with approximately 17% risk. The torsion can cause obstruction of blood flow and lead to infarction.

Types

Functional
Functional cysts form as a normal part of the menstrual cycle. There are several types of functional cysts:
 Follicular cyst, the most common type of ovarian cyst. In menstruating women, a follicle containing the ovum, an unfertilized egg, will rupture during ovulation. If this does not occur, a follicular cyst of more than 2.5 cm diameter may result.
 Corpus luteum cysts appear after ovulation. The corpus luteum is the remnant of the follicle after the ovum has moved to the fallopian tubes. This normally degrades within 5 to 9 days. A corpus luteum that is more than 3 cm is defined as cystic.
 Theca lutein cysts occur within the thecal layer of cells surrounding developing oocytes. Under the influence of excessive hCG, thecal cells may proliferate and become cystic. This is usually on both ovaries.

Non-functional
Non-functional cysts may include the following:
 An ovary with many cysts, which may be found in normal women, or within the setting of polycystic ovary syndrome
 Cysts caused by endometriosis, known as chocolate cysts
 Hemorrhagic ovarian cyst
 Dermoid cyst
 Ovarian serous cystadenoma
 Ovarian mucinous cystadenoma
 Paraovarian cyst
 Cystic adenofibroma
 Borderline tumoral cysts

Diagnosis

Ovarian cysts are usually diagnosed by ultrasound, CT scan, or MRI, and correlated with clinical presentation and endocrinologic tests as appropriate.

Ultrasound
Follow-up imaging in women of reproductive age for incidentally discovered simple cysts on ultrasound is not needed until 5 cm, as these are usually normal ovarian follicles. Simple cysts 5 to 7 cm in premenopausal females should be followed yearly. Simple cysts larger than 7 cm require further imaging with MRI or surgical assessment. Because they are large, they cannot be reliably assessed by ultrasound alone; it can be difficult to see posterior wall soft tissue nodularity or thickened septation due to limited ultrasound beam penetrance at this size and depth. For the corpus luteum, a dominant ovulating follicle that typically appears as a cyst with circumferentially thickened walls and crenulated inner margins, follow up is not needed if the cyst is less than 3 cm in diameter. In postmenopausal patients, any simple cyst greater than 1 cm but less than 7 cm needs yearly follow-up, while those greater than 7 cm need MRI or surgical evaluation, similar to reproductive age females.

For incidentally discovered dermoids, diagnosed on ultrasound by their pathognomonic echogenic fat, either surgical removal or yearly follow up is indicated, regardless of patient age. For peritoneal inclusion cysts, which have a crumpled tissue-paper appearance and tend to follow the contour of adjacent organs, follow up is based on clinical history. Hydrosalpinx, or fallopian tube dilation, can be mistaken for an ovarian cyst due to its anechoic appearance. Follow-up for this is also based on clinical presentation.

For multiloculate cysts with thin septation less than 3 mm, surgical evaluation is recommended. The presence of multiloculation suggests a neoplasm, although the thin septation implies that the neoplasm is benign. For any thickened septation, nodularity, vascular flow on color doppler, or growth over several ultrasounds, surgical removal may be considered due to concern of cancer.

Scoring systems
There are several systems to assess risk of an ovarian cyst of being an ovarian cancer, including the RMI (risk of malignancy index), LR2 and SR (simple rules). Sensitivities and specificities of these systems are given in tables below:

Ovarian cysts may be classified according to whether they are a variant of the normal menstrual cycle, referred to as a functional or follicular cyst.

Ovarian cysts are considered large when they are over 5 cm and giant when they are over 15 cm. In children, ovarian cysts reaching above the level of the umbilicus are considered giant.

Associated conditions
In juvenile hypothyroidism multicystic ovaries are present in about 75% of cases, while large ovarian cysts and elevated ovarian tumor marks are one of the symptoms of the Van Wyk and Grumbach syndrome.

The CA-125 marker in children and adolescents can be frequently elevated even in absence of malignancy and conservative management should be considered.

Polycystic ovarian syndrome involves the development of multiple small cysts in both ovaries due to an elevated ratio of leutenizing hormone to follicle stimulating hormone, typically more than 25 cysts in each ovary, or an ovarian volume of greater than 10 mL.

Larger bilateral cysts can develop as a result of fertility treatment due to elevated levels of HCG, as can be seen with the use of clomifene for follicular induction, in extreme cases resulting in a condition known as ovarian hyperstimulation syndrome. Certain malignancies can mimic the effects of clomifene on the ovaries, also due to increased HCG, in particular gestational trophoblastic disease. Ovarian hyperstimulation occurs more often with invasive moles and choriocarcinoma than complete molar pregnancies.

Risk of cancer
A widely recognised method of estimating the risk of malignant ovarian cancer based on initial workup is the risk of malignancy index (RMI). It is recommended that women with an RMI score over 200 should be referred to a centre with experience in ovarian cancer surgery.

The RMI is calculated as follows:
RMI = ultrasound score × menopausal score × CA-125 level in U/ml.

There are two methods to determine the ultrasound score and menopausal score, with the resultant RMI being called RMI 1 and RMI 2, respectively, depending on what method is used:

An RMI 2 of over 200 has been estimated to have a sensitivity of 74 to 80%, a specificity of 89 to 92% and a positive predictive value of around 80% of ovarian cancer. RMI 2 is regarded as more sensitive than RMI 1.

Histopathology
In case an ovarian cyst is surgically removed, a more definite diagnosis can be made by histopathology:

Treatment
Cysts associated with hypothyroidism or other endocrine problems are managed by treating the underlying condition.

About 95% of ovarian cysts are benign, not cancerous. Functional cysts and hemorrhagic ovarian cysts usually resolve spontaneously. However, the bigger an ovarian cyst is, the less likely it is to disappear on its own. Treatment may be required if cysts persist over several months, grow, or cause increasing pain. Cysts that persist beyond two or three menstrual cycles, or occur in post-menopausal women, may indicate more serious disease and should be investigated through ultrasonography and laparoscopy, especially in cases where family members have had ovarian cancer. Such cysts may require surgical biopsy. Additionally, a blood test may be taken before surgery to check for elevated CA-125, a tumour marker, which is often found in increased levels in ovarian cancer, although it can also be elevated by other conditions resulting in a large number of false positives.

Pain
Pain associated with ovarian cysts may be treated in several ways:
 Pain relievers such as acetaminophen, nonsteroidal anti-inflammatory drugs, or opioids.
 While hormonal birth control prevents the development of new cysts in those who frequently get them, it is not useful for the treatment of current cysts.

Surgery
Although most cases of ovarian cysts involve monitoring, some cases require surgery. This may involve removing the cyst, or one or both ovaries. Technique is typically laparoscopic, unless the cyst is particularly large, or if pre-operative imaging suggests malignancy or complex anatomy. In certain situations, the cyst is entirely removed, while with cysts with low recurrence risk, younger patients, or which are in anatomically eloquent areas of the pelvis, they can be drained. Features that may indicate the need for surgery include:
 Persistent complex ovarian cysts
 Persistent cysts that are causing symptoms
 Complex ovarian cysts larger than 5 cm
 Simple ovarian cysts larger 10 cm or larger than 5 cm in postmenopausal patients
 Women who are menopausal or perimenopausal

Frequency
Most women of reproductive age develop small cysts each month, and large cysts that cause problems occur in about 8% of women before menopause. Ovarian cysts are present in about 16% of women after menopause and if present are more likely to be cancer.

Benign ovarian cysts are common in asymptomatic premenarchal girls and found in approximately 68% of ovaries of girls 2–12 years old and in 84% of ovaries of girls 0–2 years old. Most of them are smaller than 9 mm while about 10–20% are larger macrocysts. While the smaller cysts mostly disappear within 6 months the larger ones appear to be more persistent.

References

Further reading
 
 
 
 
 
 
 

Cysts
Noninflammatory disorders of female genital tract
Wikipedia medicine articles ready to translate